Stoke Bliss is a small village and civil parish (with a shared parish council with neighbouring Kyre and Bockleton) in the Malvern Hills district of the county of Worcestershire, England.

External links

 Parish Council web site
 Church  parish of Stoke Bliss with Kyre Wyard, Hanley William and Hanley Child

Villages in Worcestershire
Civil parishes in Worcestershire